Bull Canyon Provincial Park is a provincial park in British Columbia, Canada, protecting Bull Canyon on the Chilcotin River, which is  below the confluence of the Chilko River with the Chilcotin.  The canyon and park are located just west of the community of Alexis Creek. Bull Canyon is part of a large volcanic plateau called the Chilcotin Group.

The park is c.343 ha. in size and lies on the north side of the river.

References 

Provincial parks of British Columbia
Canyons and gorges of British Columbia
Geography of the Chilcotin
1993 establishments in British Columbia